Catherine Madox Brown Hueffer (11 November 1850 – 1927), also known as Cathy, the first child of Ford Madox Brown and Emma Hill, was an artist and model associated with the Pre-Raphaelites and married to the writer Francis Hueffer.

Early life
Born out of wedlock to Ford Madox Brown and Emma Matilda Hill on 11 November 1850 in London, Catherine was named after Emma's mother. Emma and Catherine posed as the mother and child in Pretty Baa-Lambs. Catherine's parents married in 1853.

Marriage and family
She married Francis Hueffer on 3 September 1872. They had two surviving sons, Ford Madox Ford (1873-1939) and Oliver Madox Hueffer (1877-1931), both writers. Their daughter, Juliet Catherine Emma, married Russian revolutionary journalist David Soskice, with whom she had three sons including Frank Soskice, future Home Secretary. 

Francis Hueffer died in January 1889.  Emma left Catherine all of her property after her death in September 1890.

Artistic career

She began painting along with her half-sister Lucy Madox Brown, while they modelled and worked as assistants under their father. Other female Pre-Raphaelite artists such as Georgiana Burne-Jones, the sister of Thomas Seddon and Marie Spartali Stillman also took lessons in the same studio.

List of works
Portrait of her father Ford Madox Brown at the Easel, watercolour, 1870. 
At the Opera, watercolour and pencil, 1869.
Wandering Thoughts, watercolour heightened with bodycolour, 1875.
Portrait of Laura, wife of Sir Lawrence Alma-Tadema, watercolour, 1872, 50.8 x 33 cm, Exh. The Fine Art and Antiques fair Olympia, London, 2000 by Campbell Wilson (London).

Exhibitions 
'Uncommon Power': Lucy and Catherine Madox Brown at the Watts Gallery 28 September 2021 – 20 February 2022.

Work and portraits

Further reading
  Birmingham Museums & Art Gallery, Catherine Madox Brown
 Thirlwell, Angela, Into The Frame: The Four Loves of Ford Madox Brown (London: Chatto & Windus, 2010)
---., William and Lucy: The Other Rossettis. (New Haven/London: Yale University Press, 2003), 
 Marsh, Jan and Nunn, Pamela Gerrish, Women Artists and the Pre-Raphaelite Movement (London: Virago, 1989)
 Marsh, Jan, Pre-Raphaelite Sisterhood, (London: Quartet, 1985)
 Roe, Dinah The Rossettis in Wonderland. A Victorian Family History(London: Haus Publishing, 2011), 
 Gaze, Delia, Dictionary of Women Artists, Volume 1 (London: Routledge, 1997) 
  Peattie, Roger W., Selected Letters of William Michael Rossetti (University Park: Pennsylvania State University Press, 1990)
 Treuherz, Julian, Ford Madox Brown: Pre-Raphaelite Pioneer (London: Philip Wilson Publishers, 2011)

References

1850 births
1927 deaths
19th-century English painters
20th-century English painters
19th-century English women artists
20th-century English women artists
Painters from London
Pre-Raphaelite Brotherhood artists' models
English watercolourists
English women painters
Women watercolorists